Tausend is a German surname ('thousand'). Notable people with the surname include:

 Claudia Tausend (born 1964), German politician
 Franz Tausend (1884–1942), German alchemist

See also
 Townsend (surname)

Surnames of German origin